Yamaguchi 1st district (山口[県第]1区, Yamaguchi[-ken dai-]ikku) is a single-member electoral district for the House of Representatives, the lower house of the National Diet of Japan. It is located in Yamaguchi and covers the prefectural capital Yamaguchi (without the former town of Atō), parts of the city of Shūnan (the area of former municipalities Tokuyama city, Shinnan'yō city, Kano town) and the city of Hōfu. As of September 2012, 359,151 eligible voters were resident in the district.

Before the electoral reform of the 1990s, the area had been part of the five-member Yamaguchi 2nd district which covered roughly the Eastern half of the prefecture and had been the former district of LDP presidents Nobusuke Kishi and Eisaku Satō. Another representative from the pre-reform 2nd district for the LDP was former four-term Tokuyama city mayor Sakahiko Kōmura. When Kōmura retired, his fourth son Masahiko won a seat in the district in 1980 and defended it in all pre-reform elections. After the electoral reform, Masahiko Kōmura took over the new single-member 1st district for the LDP. The main opposition NFP and the newly founded DPJ did not even nominate candidates in the first post-reform election of 1996, his only challengers were a Communist and an unaffiliated independent. In subsequent elections, the enlarged/"New" DPJ did nominate candidates; but Kōmura held onto the seat by large margins, even in the countrywide DPJ victory of 2009. The district remains – like two other of Yamaguchi's districts – an unbroken "conservative kingdom" (hoshu ōkoku). In the 2017 election Masahiko Kōmura retired, his eldest son Masahiro extended the streak with a two-thirds majority in his first election.

Kōmura was a minister in several cabinets in the 1990s and 2000s (Murayama, Obuchi, Mori II, Fukuda, Abe I). From 2000 to 2012, Kōmura led the Banchō Seisaku Kenkyūjo (previously Kōmoto faction, now Ōshima faction), one of the smaller, but well-established factions of the LDP that traces its roots to the centrist Reform Party and the pre-war Constitutional Democratic Party. In 2012, LDP president Shinzō Abe (Machimura faction, also from Yamaguchi) nominated him to succeed fellow faction member Tadamori Ōshima as vice president of the party.

List of representatives

Recent results 

  
  
  
  

 
 
 
 
  
  

 
 
  
  
  

 
 
 
 
 

 
 
 
 
 

Note:

References 

Yamaguchi Prefecture
Districts of the House of Representatives (Japan)